Dissolve may refer to:

 Dissolve (filmmaking), in film and video editing, a transition between scenes
 Dissolve (2019 film), a film by Kim Ki-duk
 The Dissolve, a web magazine property of Pitchfork, covering movies
 Dissolve (band), collaborative musical project between experimental guitarists Chris Heaphy and Roy Montgomery
 "Dissolve", a song by Absofacto 
 ‘’Dissolve’’ a song by Joji from Smithereens

 "Dissolve", a song by Daniel Johns from the album Talk
 "Dissolve", a song by Hundred Reasons on the 2002 album Ideas Above Our Station

See also
 Dissolution (disambiguation)